Xie Xuren (born October 1947) is a Chinese politician, serving since 2013 as the Chair of the National Council for Social Security Fund. Previously he served as Minister of Finance of People's Republic of China, and Director-General of the State Administration of Taxation. He was also a member of the 17th Central Committee of the Chinese Communist Party.

Biography
Xie was born in 1947 in Ningbo, Zhejiang province. Xie first worked for Ningbo Zhenhai Machinery Factory. At beginning, Xie was in charge of the factory's general facilities, but later he was promoted to its vice-president. Xie joined the Chinese Communist Party in 1980.

From September 1981 to January 1984, Xie studied at Zhejiang University in Hangzhou and majored in industrial finance management. Soon after graduation, Xie joined local government of Yuyao, a county (currently a city) of Ningbo, and he was the subprefect of Yuyao. Later Xie was transferred to Yin County, a county (now a core district) of Ningbo, and became the head of the county. In September 1985, Xie was promoted to the provincial government of Zhejiang Province in Hangzhou. He was the Director of Zhejiang Provincial Economic Information Center.

Xie was also a senior economist in the government. In May 1990, Xie was promoted to the Ministry of Finance of China's central government in Beijing. In 1998, he became the President of the Agricultural Development Bank of China. In 2002, he was selected as an alternate member of the 16th CPC Central Committee, until 2007. From 2003-2007, he was the Director-General and  Secretary-General of the State Administration of Taxation of P.R.China. In 2007, he was pointed to be the Minister of Finance of P.R.China. And then became a member of the 17th CPC Central Committee.

Xie was also one of the leaders representing China during the U.S.–China Strategic and Economic Dialogue in 2009.

Policies and reform

Abolishment of agricultural taxes

In 2005, in about 28 provinces (including autonomous regions and municipalities), the agricultural taxes were cancelled. From 1949 to 2005, the total income of China's national agricultural taxes was about 420 billion yuan.

On 1 January 2006, the old regulations and laws about agricultural taxes were abolished, since then all agricultural taxes (except for tobacco) have been cancelled in mainland China, thus ended China's 2600-year history of agricultural taxes.

Revenue

In 2007, China's revenue reached a new historic height at 5.13 trillion yuan.

Although since late 2008, China has also been heavily influenced by the Global financial crisis of 2008–2009, Xie stated on January 5, 2009 that 2008 China's revenue (tax income) "are expected to breakthrough 6 trillion yuan", which would be an over 20% increase of 2007.

See also
China Economic Stimulus Program

References

External links
 Xie Xuren Biography from ChinaVitae
 Brief introduction from Xinhuanet.com

|-

1947 births
Living people
Politicians from Ningbo
People's Republic of China politicians from Zhejiang
Zhejiang University alumni
Chinese Communist Party politicians from Zhejiang
Ministers of Finance of the People's Republic of China